General Hansen may refer to:

Alfred G. Hansen (born 1933), U.S. Air Force four-star general
Christian Hansen (general) (1885–1972), German Wehrmacht general of the artillery
Erick-Oskar Hansen (1889–1967), German Wehrmacht general of the cavalry
Harold D. Hansen (1904–1987), U.S. Marine Corps brigadier general
Helge Hansen (general) (born 1936), German Army general
Murray A. Hansen (fl. 1980s–2010s), U.S. Army National Guard brigadier general
Ole Hansen (officer) (1842–1922), Norwegian Army general

See also
Roger Hanson (1827–1863), Confederate States Army brigadier general
Thomas Grafton Hanson (1865–1945), U.S. Army brigadier general
Halvor Hansson (1886–1956), Norwegian Army major general
Attorney General Hansen (disambiguation)